Billund Airport  is an airport in Denmark. Most major European airports are connected to Billund via multiple daily scheduled flights. Nearby Legoland Billund park is the largest tourist attraction in Denmark outside Copenhagen.

History
Billund Airport had its beginning in 1961 when the son of the founder of the Lego Group, Godtfred Kirk Christiansen, established a private 800-meter long runway and hangar north of his factory in Billund. With Christiansen as a key driver, more of the neighbouring municipalities were included in the group of owners, and it was planned that the airport should be expanded to a regular public airport.

The construction of the new airport was carried out during 1964 and the airport opened on 1 November, with one runway at 1660 meters in length and 45 meters width, a small platform where aircraft could be served, and a control tower. Hans Erik Christensen, the former chief pilot at Lego, became director, and the passengers were handled in Lego's hangar until the first terminal building was opened in the spring of 1966. The airport was continuously expanded in the following years, with new facilities, terminal buildings, lounge, tax-free area, and hangars where LC Johansen's studio often participated as an architect (today called Johannsen Architects), while other work was carried out by the airport's own studio.

In 1997, they had an architectural competition for a new 430,000 ft² (40,000 m2) passenger terminal, designed to serve 3.5 million passengers a year, north of the original airport. KHR Architects won the assignment and completed the construction in co-operation with COWI, and at the end of May 2002 the new passenger terminal was put to use, as the first phase of the future expansion, which is scheduled to take place north of the start and runway, while air cargo services, business and private aviation will continue to be served from the existing buildings south of the runway. In connection with this expansion, the largest since the beginning of the airport, it was with effect from 1 January 1997 turned into a joint-stock company, Billund Airport A/S, with the former members Vejle County and municipalities Vejle, Kolding, Grindsted, Billund, and Give as shareholders.

In 2008, the entire runway was renovated and paved, and a new taxiway was built, nicknamed "Mike". This major task only took 14 hours. The runway was closed overnight between the hours 23:00 and 06:00. This did not prevent a Boeing 737-800 from Ryanair landing at one end of the runway, while they worked at the other end. The same year was also a record year for the airport. 2,546,856 passengers passed through the terminals, an increase of 12.7 percent compared with 2007.

From mid-2009, the airport was served by nine airlines flying regular flight service, of which KLM had the busiest route with over 200,000 annual passengers to Amsterdam Schiphol. In 2011, Ryanair announced that Billund Airport with effect from 25 March 2012 would be the base for two Boeing 737 aircraft. At the same time Ryanair published five new routes, so that, from the summer of 2012, they would fly to 19 destinations.

From 1 January 2007 the owners are: Vejle Municipality (34.3%), Kolding Municipality (25.9%), Billund Municipality (15%), Horsens Municipality (10.7%), Fredericia Municipality (6.9%), Hedensted Municipality (6.1%), Brande Municipality (1.0%) and Skanderborg Municipality (0.1%).

In 2014, Lego produced a special Lego Architecture kit, which could only be bought in the departure hall of the airport.

A new terminal was slated to open in the fall of 2019. It cost more than 100 million Danish kroner.

Capabilities
The airport handles an average of more than three million passengers a year, and millions of pounds of cargo. The airport's main runway can handle airliners as large as the Boeing 747, although most passengers arrive on smaller aeroplanes, such as ATR-72s, Boeing 737s and Airbus A320s. Boeing 747 activity at this airport is almost exclusively limited to cargo flights.

Airlines and destinations

The following airlines operate regular scheduled and charter flights to and from Billund:

Statistics

Ground transport
The road distance is to Billund , to Vejle , to Kolding , to Esbjerg  and to Aarhus . There are airport buses to Horsens, Skanderborg and Aarhus. Eight additional bus services operate from the airport. There are six parking zones named after countries of the world, USA, Australia, Kenya, Spain, Egypt and Greenland. Three of the zones are connected by a shuttle bus, the other three being within walking distance.

See also
List of the largest airports in the Nordic countries

References

AIP Denmark: Billund – EKBI
VFR Flight Guide Denmark: Billund – EKBI

External links

 Official website
 
 

Airports in Denmark
Airports established in 1964
Buildings and structures in Billund Municipality
Transport in the Region of Southern Denmark
1964 establishments in Denmark
International airports in Denmark